Fuyang railway station may refer to:

 Fuyang railway station (Anhui) (阜阳站), a railway station in Yingdong District, Fuyang, Anhui, China.
 Fuyang railway station (Zhejiang) (富阳站), a railway station in Fuyang District, Hangzhou, Zhejiang, China.

See also
 Fuyang West railway station (disambiguation)